The South African Railways Class MJ1 2-6-6-0 of 1918 was a class of articulated steam locomotives.

In 1918, the South African Railways placed eight Class MJ1 Mallet articulated compound steam locomotives with a 2-6-6-0 wheel arrangement in branch line service.

Manufacturer
Because of the difficulties experienced by the usual British and German suppliers to build new locomotives during the First World War, orders for the Class MJ1 2-6-6-0 Mallet articulated compound steam locomotive were placed with Montreal Locomotive Works (MLW) in Canada. The locomotive was designed by MLW, based on the specifications for the Class MJ Mallet which had been designed by D.A. Hendrie, the Chief Mechanical Engineer (CME) of the South African Railways (SAR) from 1910 to 1922. Eight of these branch line locomotives were built and delivered by MLW in November 1918, numbered in the range from 1666 to 1673.

Characteristics
The locomotives were superheated, had Walschaerts valve gear and, like the Class MJ Mallets, had Belpaire fireboxes, but slightly larger boilers. When compared to the Class MJ, a distinguishing feature of the Class MJ1 was the sandbox which was mounted on top of the boiler to the rear of the steam dome in North American style. In general appearance, they bore a family resemblance to the Class 14C and Class 15B 4-8-2 locomotives which were also built by MLW in 1918.

Reboilering
During 1939, while W.A.J. Day was the CME of the SAR, the Classes MJ and MJ1 were modified slightly to be reboilered with the same standard boiler.

Service
The Class MJ1 was the last Mallet locomotive class to be placed in service by the SAR. All the Railway’s subsequent new articulated locomotives were to be Garratts, Modified Fairlies and Union Garratts.

The Class MJ1 was also intended for branch line working and joined the Class MJ Mallets in service in the Eastern Cape. All eight were still in service by March 1948, but they were all withdrawn from service by 1960.

Illustration

References

2300
2-6-6-0 locomotives
(1C)C locomotives
MLW locomotives
Cape gauge railway locomotives
Railway locomotives introduced in 1918
1918 in South Africa
Scrapped locomotives